Edward Michael Scheidt is a retired Chairman of the Central Intelligence Agency (CIA) Cryptographic Center and the designer of the cryptographic systems used in the Kryptos sculpture at CIA Headquarters in Langley, Virginia.

Early life
Scheidt was born July 20, 1939 in Santa Monica, California United States. He graduated in 1957 from Cor Jesu High School in New Orleans and then joined the Army, where he worked in Signals Intelligence.

CIA
In 1963, he was hired as a communications officer for the CIA,  in the Office of Communications, which began a 26-year career, retiring in December 1989.  Scheidt spent 12 years posted overseas, including serving in Laos in the early 1960s, Lebanon in the late 1960s, and a tour in Southeast Asia. Most often he used one-time pad paper systems of encryption. Scheidt received a B.A. in business administration from the University of Maryland in 1970 and a degree in telecommunications from George Washington University in 1975.

Scheidt is best known for his involvement with Kryptos, a sculpture in the CIA courtyard which contains one of the world's most famous unsolved codes.  Kryptos was created by Washington DC sculptor Jim Sanborn, who was commissioned by the CIA in the 1980s to create art around their new Headquarters building in 1988.  After Sanborn decided he wanted to incorporate some encrypted messages in his artwork, he was teamed with Scheidt, who was in the process of retiring and was called by then-director William H. Webster "The Wizard of Codes".  Up until that point, Sanborn had never used encryption or text in his work. Scheidt taught various encryption methods to Sanborn, who chose the exact messages to be encrypted.  Of the messages on the sculpture, three have been solved, but the fourth section, 97 or 98 characters at the very bottom, remains uncracked."

In 1991, journalist Bill Gertz referred to Scheidt as the "Deep Throat of Codes" while describing his clandestine meetings with Sanborn. This nickname was later said to have been applied to Scheidt by Webster before being added to Scheidt's bio on the TecSec website by 2015.

TecSec
In the early 1990s, Scheidt noted that encryption, which originated for primarily one-to-one communications, now faced new and substantially different key management requirements in large network or virtual network environments.  It was into this technologically dynamic environment that Ed co-founded TecSec Inc., a software encryption company in 1990 in Vienna, Virginia, where as of 2020 he works as Chief Scientist.

One of their first ventures was to manufacture portable satellite versions of the secure STU-III telephones used by the government.  Scheidt manufactured the first model in his home basement workshop, and approximately 500 were in use worldwide by the United States Foreign Service as of 2002. The company also set out to create an encryption design with its key management that could be cited in standards or use components of standards.

In forming TecSec and building the company's large IP library, he anticipated the flexibility and mobility required of 21st Century communication systems with a key management system that is primarily client-based and much less dependent upon a central server. The relative scalability achieved by this approach, together with encryption at the object level, provides enforced role based access and granularity not otherwise available.  Ed remains deeply involved in the company's product development and expanding application solutions, just as he is in general management.

In February 2010 TecSec filed a lawsuit against several large tech vendors claiming infringement of several patents covering encryption technology.

Other
As of September 2020, Scheidt is vice chair, ANSI X9F for global security standards, Accredited Standards Committee X9, which develops and promotes standards for the US financial services industry.  Scheidt is also convenor of ISO TC68/SC2/Working group (WG) 17 for the creation of the digital currency security Technical Specification international standard. WG17 includes representation from various countries and commercial interest.  As convenor of WG17, Scheidt represents ISO to ITU for their Fiat digital currency efforts.

References

Further reading
 "Information-Centric Security", February 6, 2004, Pentagon report, co-written with Wai Tsang and Karen Burkardsmaier

External links
 Kryptos FAQ
 TecSec information page
 "Techway", November 7, 2002, The Washington Post
 Bouchercon 2001
 The Peggy Smedley Show, 5 August 2014

Living people
Modern cryptographers
American cryptographers
People of the Central Intelligence Agency
1939 births
Brother Martin High School alumni
George Washington University alumni
People from New Orleans
Mathematicians from California
Mathematicians from Louisiana